Jacqueline Richard (March 8, 1928 - August 2, 2015) was a Québécoise Canadian pianist and conductor who resigned from the Order of Canada in 2009. Her resignation was in protest of the appointment of abortion provider Henry Morgentaler to the order.

Biography
Jacqueline Richard was born March 8, 1928, in Montreal, Quebec.

Richard performed with Jeunesses Musicales Canada, during the years of 1950-1951, 1954-1955, and every year between 1957-1961.

In 1963, she founded the Boutique d'opéra. She presented 75 performances, in two years, of various operatic works including L'Oca del Cairo by Mozart.

In 1984, she co-founded the Atelier lyrique de l'Opéra de Montréal.

In 1985, she retired to coach singers privately.

She died on 2 August 2015 in Montreal.

Accolades
Jacqueline Richard was awarded the Quebec Lieutenant-Governor's medal in 1953.
She was awarded the Order of Canada in 2004.

References

Canadian classical pianists
Canadian women pianists
Canadian conductors (music)
Musicians from Montreal
1928 births
2015 deaths
Women classical composers